Bom Jesus do Tocantins is a municipality located in the Brazilian state of Pará. Its population was 17,118 (2020), and its area is 2,816.425 km². The municipality was founded on May 10, 1988, after separating from São João do Araguaia city.

The districts of Bom Jesus do Tocantins, Vila São Raimundo and Vila Carne do Sul are part of the municipality. There is an Indian reservation in the municipality, named Mãe Maria, inhabited by the Gavião people, which are the Kyikatejê and Parkatejê villages.

Gavião Kyikatejê Futebol Clube is the football club based in the city.

References

Municipalities in Pará